Two escort carriers of the United States Navy have been named USS Prince William, after Prince William Sound in Alaska.

  was transferred to the Royal Navy in 1943 and served as  until 1946.
  was engaged in transport and training duties from commissioning in 1943 to decommissioning in 1946.

United States Navy ship names